In cryptography, the anonymous veto network (or AV-net) is a multi-party secure computation protocol to compute the boolean-OR function. It was first proposed by Feng Hao and Piotr Zieliński in 2006. This protocol presents an efficient solution to the Dining cryptographers problem.

A related protocol that securely computes a boolean-count function is open vote network (or OV-net).

Description

All participants agree on a group  with a generator  of prime order  in which the discrete logarithm problem is hard. For example, a Schnorr group can be used.  For a group of  participants, the protocol executes in two rounds.

Round 1: each participant  selects a random value  and publishes the ephemeral public key  together with a zero-knowledge proof for the proof of the exponent .

After this round, each participant computes:

Round 2: each participant  publishes  and a zero-knowledge proof for the proof of the exponent . Here, the participants chose  if they want to send a "0" bit (no veto), or a random value if they want to send a "1" bit (veto).

After round 2, each participant computes . If no one vetoed, each will obtain . On the other hand, if one or more participants vetoed, each will have .

The protocol design

The protocol is designed by combining random public keys in such a structured way to achieve a vanishing effect. In this case, . For example, if there are three participants, then . A similar idea, though in a non-public-key context, can be traced back to David Chaum's original solution to the Dining cryptographers problem.

References

Public-key cryptography
Zero-knowledge protocols